The 2016–17 Florida Panthers season was the 24th season for the National Hockey League franchise that was established on June 14, 1993. This season saw the Panthers unable to qualify for the playoffs.

Standings

Schedule and results

Pre-season

Regular season

Player stats 
Final Stats

Skaters

Goaltenders

†Denotes player spent time with another team before joining the Panthers. Stats reflect time with the Panthers only.
‡Denotes player was traded mid-season. Stats reflect time with the Panthers only.
Bold/italics denotes franchise record.

Transactions 
The Panthers were involved in the following transactions during the 2016–17 season:

Trades

Free agents acquired

Free agents lost

Claimed via waivers

Lost via waivers

Lost via retirement

Player signings

Draft picks

Below are the Florida Panthers' selections at the 2016 NHL Entry Draft, to be held on June 24–25, 2016 at the First Niagara Center in Buffalo, New York.

Notes

 The Buffalo Sabres' second-round pick went to the Florida Panthers as the result of a trade on June 25, 2016 that sent Dmitri Kulikov and Vancouver's second-round pick in 2016 (33rd overall) to Buffalo in exchange for Mark Pysyk, St. Louis' third-round pick in 2016 (89th overall) and this pick.
 The Florida Panthers' second-round pick went to the Calgary Flames as the result of a trade on February 27, 2016 that sent Jiri Hudler to Florida in exchange for a fourth-round pick in 2018 and this pick.
 The Florida Panthers' third-round pick went to the Edmonton Oilers as the result of a trade on February 27, 2016 that sent Teddy Purcell to Florida in exchange for this pick (being conditional at the time of the trade). The condition – Edmonton will receive the lower of Minnesota or Florida's third-round pick in 2016 – was converted on April 24, 2016 when Minnesota was eliminated from the 2016 Stanley Cup playoffs ensuring that the Florida's pick would be lower than Minnesota's.
 The St. Louis Blues' third-round pick went to the Florida Panthers as the result of a trade on June 25, 2016 that sent Dmitri Kulikov and Vancouver's second-round pick in 2016 (33rd overall) to Buffalo in exchange for Mark Pysyk, a second-round pick in 2016 (38th overall) and this pick.
Buffalo previously acquired this pick as the result of a trade on February 28, 2014 that sent Ryan Miller, Steve Ott and conditional second and third-round picks in 2014 to St. Louis in exchange for Jaroslav Halak, Chris Stewart, William Carrier, a first-round pick in 2015 and this pick (being conditional at the time of the trade). The condition – Buffalo will receive a third-round pick in 2016 if Miller does not re-sign with St. Louis for the 2014–15 NHL season – was converted on July 1, 2014 when Miller signed with Vancouver.

 The Vancouver Canucks' fourth-round pick went to the Florida Panthers as the result of a trade on May 25, 2016 that sent Erik Gudbranson and the Islanders fifth-round pick in 2016 to Vancouver in exchange for Jared McCann, a second-round pick in 2016 and this pick.
 The Florida Panthers' fifth-round pick went to the St. Louis Blues as the result of a trade on June 25, 2016 that sent a fifth-round pick in 2017 to Chicago in exchange for this pick.
Chicago previously acquired this pick as the result of a trade on March 2, 2014 that sent Brandon Pirri to Florida in exchange for a third-round pick in 2014 and this pick.

 The Florida Panthers' sixth-round pick went to the New York Rangers as the result of a trade on June 20, 2016 that sent Keith Yandle to Florida in exchange for a conditional fourth-round pick in 2017 and this pick.
 The Anaheim Ducks' sixth-round pick went to the Florida Panthers as the result of a trade on February 29, 2016 that sent Brandon Pirri to Anaheim in exchange for this pick.
 The Boston Bruins' seventh-round pick went to the Florida Panthers as the result of a trade on June 25, 2016 that sent a seventh-round pick in 2017 to Boston in exchange for this pick.
 The Florida Panthers' seventh-round pick went to the Minnesota Wild as the result of a trade on February 24, 2015 that sent a third-round pick in 2016 to Florida in exchange for Sean Bergenheim and this pick.

References

Florida Panthers seasons
Florida Panthers
Florida Panthers
Florida Panthers